Alice Clark may refer to:
 Alice Clark (historian), British feminist and historian
 Alice Clark (singer), American soul singer

See also
 Alice Clarke, English cricketer